Crosshouse is a village in East Ayrshire about  west of Kilmarnock. It grew around the cross-roads of the main Kilmarnock to Irvine road, once classified as the A71 but now reduced in status to the B7081, with a secondary road (the B751) running from Kilmaurs south to Gatehead and beyond towards Prestwick. The Carmel Water, a tributary of the River Irvine, flows through the centre of the village.

Andrew Fisher, who was the fifth Prime Minister of Australia, was born in the village and a plaque commemorating him is located at the road junction to Knockentiber.

Health
The village is the location of a major hospital, Crosshouse Hospital, which was built to replace the Kilmarnock Infirmary.

Transport
Crosshouse is served by the Stagecoach Group, running through from Kilmarnock to Irvine and Ardrossan.

It was the point at which the railway line from Kilmarnock divided, to Dalry to the north-west and Irvine to the west. The latter line has been converted into a walkway and cycleway.

References

External links

Villages in East Ayrshire